Kateri Champagne Jourdain is a Canadian politician, who was elected to the National Assembly of Quebec in the 2022 Quebec general election. She represents the riding of Duplessis as a member of the Coalition Avenir Québec. She is the first indigenous woman elected to the National Assembly.

References

21st-century Canadian politicians
21st-century Canadian women politicians
Coalition Avenir Québec MNAs
Women MNAs in Quebec
Innu people
Living people
Year of birth missing (living people)
First Nations politicians